The Mystery of the Hidden House is the sixth in the Five Find-Outers children's novels by Enid Blyton.  It was first published in 1948 by Methuen and was illustrated by Joseph Abbey.

Synopsis
Pip, Bets, Larry and Daisy mistake Ernest "Ern" Goon, the village policeman's nephew, for their good friend Fatty in one of his disguises. They even call him Fatty and Bets gives him a Christmas present meant for Fatty, a notebook with his name on it. When Ern tells all this to Mr. Goon, the policeman asks the children's parents to ban them from solving another mystery. The children then invent a fake mystery about kidnappers and robbers on Christmas Hill, hoping Ern will pass the information on to Mr. Goon. They also encourage Ern to investigate at Christmas Hill, where Larry and Pip plan to flash some lights and Fatty will hide himself to give Ern a scare. Meanwhile, Mr. Goon finds Ern's notes about the "mystery" and threatens to punish him. Mr. Goon then goes out at night to investigate the hill. Ern sets out to follow him but goes in the wrong direction, along the road to "Harry's Folly", where he witnesses some mysterious voices, footsteps and lights. He tells the Find-Outers, who don't believe him at first, but then decide to investigate.
Fatty dresses as Ern for fun and consequently Ern is captured and taken to Harry's Folly. Bets suggests to Fatty that Ern may be there, and Fatty investigates, with Pip and Larry in tow. Ern is there and Fatty asks him to wait until the next morning so the crooks could be captured. Inspector Jenks later sends six policecars to Harry's Folly. Ern is rescued and promises to tear up a rude poem that Fatty wrote about Mr. Goon, as both Ern and Mr. Goon think that Ern wrote it.

Characters

Bets – the youngest of the Five Find-Outers and Dog
Pip – a member of the Five Find-Outers and Dog
Larry – the former chief of the Five Find-Outers and Dog
Daisy – a member of the Five Find-Outers and Dog
Fatty – the chief of the Five Find-Outers and Dog
Buster – a dog owned by Fatty
Mr. Holland – a garage owner who is also a criminal
Mr. Peters – the gatekeeper of "Harry's Folly"
Ern Goon – the nephew of Mr Goon
Mr. Goon – Peterwood's local policeman
Inspector Jenks – a friend of the Five Find-Outers and Dog
Mr and Mrs. Hilton – parents of Pip (Philip Hilton) and Bets (Elizabeth Hilton)

References

External links
 

Novels by Enid Blyton
1948 British novels
Methuen Publishing books
1948 children's books